John Ross Roach (June 23, 1900 – July 9, 1973) was a Canadian professional ice hockey goaltender who played in the National Hockey League between 1921 and 1935. His nicknames were "Little Napoleon", "The Housecleaner", and "The Port Perry Cucumber".

Playing career
Roach was born in Port Perry, Ontario. He won a Stanley Cup in 1922. Roach was one of only six goalies in the NHL to captain his team when he was with the Toronto St. Patricks during the 1924–25 season. He was a First Team All-Star during the 1932–33 NHL season. Roach was known for his acrobatic style of goaltending. 

In the 2009 book 100 Ranger Greats, the authors ranked Roach at No. 64 all-time of the 901 New York Rangers who had played during the team's first 82 seasons.

Career statistics

Regular season and playoffs

References

External links
 
 

1900 births
1973 deaths
Canadian ice hockey goaltenders
Detroit Olympics (IHL) players
Detroit Red Wings players
Ice hockey people from Ontario
New York Rangers players
National Hockey League goaltender captains
People from Scugog
Stanley Cup champions
Syracuse Stars (IHL) players
Toronto Maple Leafs players
Toronto St. Pats players